Terra Incognita is an outdoor 1995 sculpture by Israeli artist Ilan Averbuch, located at the foot of the Broadway Bridge in Portland, Oregon.

Description and history
Terra Incognita, designed by Ilan Averbuch, was installed at North Broadway and North Larrabee Avenue, at the foot of the Broadway Bridge, in Portland's Rose Quarter in 1995. The gate-like sculpture is made from steel, wood, stone and copper, and measures  x  x . It forms five cubes in a "strong positive negative pattern". The three base cubes are bundled tree trunks, and the two cubes suspended by the lower three are stone piles. According to the Regional Arts & Culture Council, which administer the sculpture: 
This work relates to its site in a broad context. It plays off the power of the natural landscape, the rivers, hillsides and mountains, as well as the power and scale of the man-made elements such as surrounding bridges and buildings. Averbuch felt that the dramatic relationship between wood and stone are appropriate for Portland. This sculpture has a feeling of fortification and frontier, elements the artist associates with Oregon.

It is part of the City of Portland and Multnomah County Public Art Collection courtesy of the Regional Arts & Culture Council.

See also
 1995 in art
 Little Prince (sculpture), another 1995 sculpture by Averbuch located in the Rose Quarter

References

External links

 Resonant Reflections: The Art of Ilan Averbuch by Rachel Rosenfield Lafo (PDF)
 A Guide to Portland Public Art (PDF), Regional Arts & Culture Council

1995 establishments in Oregon
1995 sculptures
Copper sculptures in Oregon
Lloyd District, Portland, Oregon
North Portland, Oregon
Outdoor sculptures in Portland, Oregon
Steel sculptures in Oregon
Stone sculptures in Oregon
Wooden sculptures in Oregon